Mozaffarabad (also Romanized as Moz̧affarābād; also known as Muzafarābād, and Muzaffarābād) is a village in Ivughli Rural District, Ivughli District, Khoy County, West Azerbaijan Province, Iran. At the 2006 census, its population was 289, in 64 families.

References 

Populated places in Khoy County